Olga Sofia Ravn (born 27 September 1986) is a Danish poet and novelist. Initially she published poetry which was acclaimed by the critics, as was her first novel Celestine (2015). She is also a translator and has worked as a literary critic for Politiken and several other Danish publications.

Early life and education 
Olga Ravn was born and raised in Copenhagen, the daughter of singer Anne Dorte Michelsen and visual artist and designer Peter Ravn. In 2010 she graduated from the Danish School of Authors, in that city.

Work 

Ravn published her first poem in the Copenhagen literary magazine  in 2008. Her early poetry, described as "rhythmic, playful, sensual and image-rich", earned positive critical reception.

In 2012 Ravn published her first collection of poetry,  ("I Eat Myself Like Heather"). The collection explores how young women's bodies react to friendship, sex, and love. In 2013 the collection was translated into Swedish.

In 2014 Ravn published a chapbook of poetry titled Mean Girl, consisting of coloured sheets of paper and glimmering scraps. Only 250 copies were released, each prepared with individual attention so that none were identical.

Ravn was editor on the 2015 book  ("I Wanted to Be a Widow, and I Wanted to Be a Poet: Forgotten texts by Tove Ditlevsen").

In 2015 she published her first novel, Celestine, about a boarding school teacher's obsession with a ghost who has much in common with her. The main difference between the two, the teacher points out, is that she is not yet dead.

In 2021, The Employees: A workplace novel of the 22nd century appears, a novel of work and life aboard a ship in deep space in the future. This novel was shortlisted for the 2021 International Booker Prize and in 2022 for the inaugural Ursula K. Le Guin Prize for Fiction.

Ravn regularly posts short writings, videos and pictures on her blog and Tumblr account.

Critical reception 
Ravn was positively reviewed in the autumn edition of the Danish Literary Magazine in 2011, which described her upcoming poetry collection, as "a passionate, lyrical collection that deals with freeing oneself from the role of young girl". The book was also said to have received positive reviews from Danish critics who described it as "bursting with talent" and "ambitious and well-wrought".

On Celestine, Søren Kassebeer of Berlingske compliments the author on her use of language: "She can achieve so incredibly much with words... There seem to be no limits to her ability to create images." Nevertheless, although he finds Celestine readable, he does not regard it a complete success, commenting that it constantly dwells on feelings expressed either by the narrator or the ghost, rather than simply saying what needs to be said. Lilian Munk Rösing of Politiken is particularly impressed with Ravn's use of images and metaphore, becoming totally obsessed with the author's command of powerful, at times humorous language. Victor Malm writing in Sydsvenskan says: "The novel [resembles] Marguerite Duras and Clarice Lispector. Through an intensive rinsing stream of scenes, images and memories an empty feeling of life ahead is evoked."

In 2019, Ravn was awarded the Beatrice Prize. Her novel, The Employees, was shortlisted for the International Booker Prize.

Other activities 
Ravn is a writing instructor at Testrup Højskole, a literary critic for Politiken, and an editor at Gyldendal.

Bibliography

Books 
  (Novel)
  (Poems)
 
  (Poems)
  (Poems)
  (Novel)

Selected articles

See also 
 List of Danish women writers

References

External links 
 Olga Ravn's blog 

1986 births
Living people
Danish women novelists
Danish women poets
21st-century Danish translators
Danish literary critics
Women literary critics
Danish editors
Danish women editors
21st-century Danish novelists
Writers from Copenhagen
21st-century Danish women writers
21st-century Danish poets